, née , was a Japanese actress, voice actress, and television presenter. She was known for her work on television dramas, as well as hosting entertainment and variety shows, such as Renso Game on NHK. Okae also hosted the morning show  on Tokyo Broadcasting System Television from 1996 to 2014.

Career 
Okae began her professional acting career in 1975. She appeared in numerous television roles and variety shows from the 1970s to the 2010s. In 1982, she released the album Yes, I Feel on the Casablanca label. She acted in television dramas, and hosted entertainment and variety shows, such as Renso Game on NHK. Okae hosted the morning show, on Tokyo Broadcasting System Television from 1996 until 2014.

Personal life 
Okae married actor  in 1983. They had a daughter, Miho Ohwada.

Death
Okae underwent surgery for early stage breast cancer in late 2019. She was then treated with Radiation therapy from January to mid-February 2020, which further weakened her immune system. On 3 April 2020, Okae developed a fever and her health began to deteriorate. She was admitted to a Tokyo hospital on 6 April, placed on a ventilator and later diagnosed with COVID-19 during the COVID-19 pandemic in Japan. Okae died from pneumonia in the Tokyo hospital on April 23, 2020, at the age of 63. She is survived by her husband and daughter.

References

External links
 

1956 births
2020 deaths
Japanese television actresses
Japanese voice actresses
Japanese television presenters
Japanese women television presenters
Japanese television talk show hosts
Japanese game show hosts
Japanese television personalities
Actresses from Tokyo
People from Setagaya
20th-century Japanese actresses
21st-century Japanese actresses
Deaths from the COVID-19 pandemic in Japan
Deaths from pneumonia in Japan